Tanzania Commission for Universities (TCU) is the statutory and regulatory  organization established in 2005 by the Tanzanian Government to oversee university education in Tanzania. It is the body whose recognition, approval and accredidation is needed before any university can started.

References

External links 
Official Website

Educational institutions established in 2005
2005 establishments in Tanzania
Universities in Tanzania
Education in Dar es Salaam